There are 8 major river systems in India, with more than 400 rivers in total. Rivers play an important role in the lives of the Indian people due to their crucial importance in sustenance and their place in Indian religions. The table below lists the rivers of India with their average annual discharge into either the Bay of Bengal and Arabian Sea. Only rivers with discharging into the sea are listed, so no tributaries are listed, some of which can have flow rates much higher than some of the rivers listed in the table.

See also

 List of drainage basins by area
 List of rivers by discharge
List of rivers by dissolved load
 Indian Rivers Inter-link
 Interstate River Water Disputes Act
 Irrigation in India
 List of rivers by discharge
 List of dams and reservoirs in India
 National Water Policy
 Water scarcity in India
 Water supply and sanitation in India
 Water pollution in India

References

Discharge